DWSR (1260 AM) is a relay station of DZRH, owned and operated by Manila Broadcasting Company. The station's transmitter is located along Hermana Fausta St. cor. Enriquez St., Lucena City.

References

External links
DZRH FB Page
DZRH Website

DZRH Nationwide stations
Radio stations in Lucena, Philippines
Radio stations established in 1989